Chirag Patil (born 10 March 1987) is an Indian actor who appears in Hindi and Marathi films. He is best known for his role as Omkar in Vazandar (2016) directed by Sachin Kundalkar. Patil made his big screen debut with Raada Rox (2011), the film was directed by Rahul Thackeray and Heyramb S Khot. He made his Bollywood debut with Chargesheet (2011) directed by Dev Anand. He is the son of a famous Indian cricketer Sandeep Patil and played the role of his father in the movie 83 based on the 1983 Cricket World Cup win by the Indian Cricket team.

Media image

Filmography

Hindi films

Marathi films

Marathi TV series

References

External links

1987 births
Living people
Male actors from Mumbai
Male actors in Marathi television